Football Club Metalist Kharkiv is a Ukrainian football club based in Kharkiv that plays in the Ukrainian First League during the 2021–22 season. It was revived 5 years after the original FC Metalist Kharkiv ceased operations.

Founded in 1925, FC Metalist Kharkiv had worked its way up the rungs of the Soviet football system, eventually being promoted to the Soviet Top League in 1960. After a difficult period which included relegation, Metalist was promoted to the Top League again in 1982, where it remained until the league's dissolution.

The club won the Soviet Cup once, and were also runners-up once. They have also won silver medals of the 2012–13 Ukrainian Premier League and six bronze medals of the Ukrainian Premier League, starting from the 2006–07 season. Their home was the Metalist Stadium, a multi-use facility with a capacity of 40,003. The stadium was originally built in 1926 and was expanded to host Euro 2012 football matches.

Metalist ceased operations in 2016 due to insolvency. Metalist owed in salary to its players 32 million Euros with 5 million to Cleiton Xavier in particular. It was removed from the Ukrainian Premier League after owner Serhiy Kurchenko absconded in February 2014, following the 2014 Ukrainian revolution.

Following the demise of Metalist Kharkiv in 2016, two new clubs were created in Kharkiv with variations of the Metalist club name. Since July 2016, a team named "SK Metalist Kharkiv" has been playing in the Kharkiv Oblast Championship, whose owner is Metalist owner Serhiy Kurchenko.

In August 2016, another club named "FC Metalist 1925 Kharkiv" began to operate in the Ukrainian Amateur Football League with the stated intention of competing in the (professional) Ukrainian Second League as soon as possible. "FC Metalist 1925 Kharkiv" is owned by a company not linked with the original FC Metalist Kharkiv.

In October 2017, a Ukrainian court confiscated (the original) Metalist Kharkiv from Kurchenko and placed it under state property. At the time the club did not participate in any official sanctioned competitions.

Also, in July 2020 former FC Metalist sports director Yevhen Krasnikov created FC Metal Kharkiv which since has participated in the Ukrainian Second League. Earlier on 5 May 2020, Oleksandr Yaroslavskyi announced that he wishes to take care of the debts of the liquidated Metalist.<ref>Yevhenia Motorevska. Антикризовик Ярославський: що відомо про харківського бізнесмена. www.slidstvo.info. 23 March 2020</ref> The return of Yaroslavskyi to football arose some criticism connected with politics of the city of Kharkiv. After winning the Second League in June 2021, it was confirmed that Metal will be renamed to Metalist and the old FC Metalist Kharkiv logo will be returned to the club, along with its brand and history.

History
 USSR competitions 
The team has played under the following names:
 KhPZ (1925–1940)
 Dzerzhinets (1947–1952)
 Avanhard/Avangard (1956–1967)
 Metalist/Metallist (since 1967)

FC Metalist Kharkiv was initially founded on 11 December 1925 as KhPZ, when a local locomotive construction facility (Kharkiv Steam-locomotive Factory, today the Malyshev Factory) provided funding and allowed use of its land to start a football club. Ten years later, the club won the city of Kharkiv championship, which allowed the club to enter the USSR Cup in the following season. Following World War II, the club under the name Dzerzhinets resumed playing in local competitions, promoting itself to the Second Group (Soviet Second Division) in 1947 only to be demoted three seasons later. In the first post-war decade the club was completely overshadowed by its city rival FC Lokomotyv Kharkiv which was member of the Soviet Lokomotiv sports society.

In 1956, Metalist as Avanhard returned to the Soviet Second League B replacing its city rivals Lokomotyv Kharkiv. Soon thereafter it was promoted first to Soviet First League in 1958, and later to the Soviet Top League in 1960. The club stayed in Top League for 4 seasons, but was demoted to First League in 1963, continuing its decline with demotion to Second League. In 1978, the club was promoted to the Soviet First League and two years later, the club finished third in the competition narrowly missing promotion to the top flight. The following season, the club improved on their previous performance and won the Soviet First League outright to earn a spot in Soviet Top League. The club sustained 10 seasons of the Soviet Top League with several successes on the domestic front. In 1983, Metalist was the runner-up in the USSR Cup (losing 1–0 to Shakhtar Donetsk) and a few years later in 1988 would win the cup, beating Torpedo Moscow 2–0. As a result, Metalist Kharkiv earned a trip to the UEFA Cup Winners' Cup. Metalist only advanced to the last sixteen of the competition, beating Yugoslavian side Borac Banja Luka and losing to the Dutch club Roda JC.

 Ukrainian Premier League 
After the dissolution of the Soviet Union and the formation of an independent Ukraine, Metalist joined the inaugural season of the Ukrainian Premier League in 1992. The club finished in fifth place, an achievement it would never top until the 2006–07 season, finishing in fifth place three more times since, the most notable coming during the 2001–02 season. The club finished with 40 points, on a par with Metalurh Zaporizhzhya and Dnipro Dnipropetrovsk for a three-way tie. Metalist was expected to take fourth place (and subsequently compete in the UEFA Cup) by virtue of having the best three-way, head-to-head record among the three teams (which is the official tie-breaker to be used in domestic competitions), but following a protest by Metalurh Zaporizhzhya and an arbitrary decision by PFL (the administrative body of the UPL), Metalurh Zaporizhzhya was awarded fourth place on the grounds that it had better head-to-head records independently against either side.

Following unsuccessful protests from Metalist, a disheartened management, team and fan base would see the club finish bottom in the following season and earning a demotion to the Ukrainian First League. However, the club would return to the UPL after one season and following a financial crisis and a takeover of the club by UkrSibbank owner Oleksandr Yaroslavsky, steady investment would see Metalist show improvement and balanced performance. Yaroslavsky sold the club to new owner Serhiy Kurchenko late in December 2012. Kurchenko left Ukraine in February 2014 following the 2014 Ukrainian revolution and his current whereabouts are unknown.

 European competitions 

In the 2006–07 season, Metalist finished third place in the league, qualifying for the 2007–08 UEFA Cup, their second appearance in a UEFA competition. They were drawn against English club Everton. The first leg, away at Goodison Park, ended in a 1–1 draw while Everton won the second leg 3–2, eliminating Metalist.

Metalist's next European competition was the 2008–09 UEFA Cup. The club beat Beşiktaş 4–2 on aggregate in the first round to qualify for the group stage, where they were grouped with Galatasaray, Olympiacos, Hertha BSC and Benfica. Metalist finished top of the group, beating Galatasaray, Olympiacos and Benfica, whilst drawing 0–0 with Hertha. In the round of 32, Metalist defeated Italian club Sampdoria 3–0 on aggregate, setting up for an all-Ukrainian round of 16 tie against Dynamo Kyiv. After losing in Kyiv 1–0, Metalist won the return leg 3–2, but were eliminated on the away goals rule.

When the competition was re-branded as the Europa League for the 2009–10 season, Metalist beat Croatian side HNK Rijeka 4–1 on aggregate in the third qualifying round before losing 2–1 on aggregate to Austrian side Sturm Graz, despite holding them 1–1 in Graz. The following season, they finished second in Group I behind Dutch giants PSV Eindhoven, thus qualifying for the round of 32 where they were thrashed 6–0 on aggregate by Bayer Leverkusen. They reached the quarter-finals the following season, beating Olympiacos on away goals in the round of 16, but falling to Sporting CP. The following season, they then faced Bayer Leverkusen again—after beating Leverkusen 2–0 on 22 November 2012, Metalist finished above the side on head-to-head points (13), as they both finished on 13 points and had played out a goalless draw at the BayArena. In the round of 32, Metalist then faced English club Newcastle United. After holding them to a goalless draw at St James' Park in the first leg on 14 February, Shola Ameobi scored a penalty sent Newcastle through 1–0 on aggregate.

In August 2013, UEFA disqualified Metalist from all 2013–14 UEFA competitions.

Stoppage in 2016 and the new club
It is believed that Serhiy Kurchenko bought the club from Yaroslavskyi at the end of 2012 for $100 million, supposedly. According to Kurchenko, he invested into the club around $270 million, but ran out of Ukraine in 2014. Since then, financing of the club was stopped.

On 22 April 2016, the FFU Committee announced that Metalist would not be allowed to participate in professional competitions because of its debts to its players. On 16 May 2016, the FFU Appeal Committee left in force the decision of the FFU Football Clubs Attestation Committee of 22 April 2016 and refused in issuing attestation for the next season for the club by declining its appeals. Metalist owed in salary to its players 32 million Euros with 5 million to Cleiton Xavier in particular. In June of 2016 Nashi Groshi were informing that National Police of Ukraine opened criminal proceedings and asked the court on access to the Metalist salaries data. According to the Kominternivskyi District Court of Kharkiv, Metalist debt to its players and personnel exceeds over ₴30 million.

In July 2016, a team named SK Metalist Kharkiv started playing in the Kharkiv Oblast Championship. "SK Metalist Kharkiv" is owned by the same man under whose watch Metalist Kharkiv was expelled from the professional leagues: Serhiy Kurchenko. In 2016 Kharkiv Oblast Championship, the club competed under the name UPhC Olimpik – SC Metalist and placed the last place. UPhC Olimpik is a team of the Kharkiv State College of Physical Culture 1.

In August 2016, a new club called FC Metalist 1925 Kharkiv applied for the 2016–17 Ukrainian Football Amateur League, where it was headed by Oleksandr Pryzetko. Metalist Kharkiv headed Prizetko 1925, UA-Football (August 16, 2016) The owner of FC Metalist 1925 Kharkiv is the company TOV Avanhard Kharkiv, later renamed to FC Metalist 1925 Kharkiv. TOV Avanhard Kharkiv is controlled by businessman and Kharkiv City Council deputy for Petro Poroshenko Bloc "Solidarity" Oleksandr Davtyan and his family. The club has planned to play in the professional Ukrainian Second League as soon as possible.

Since March 2017, FC Metalist 1925 Kharkiv plays its home matches at the Metalist Stadium; where Metalist Kharkiv used to play its home games.

On 28 April 2017 the FFU Control and Disciplinary Committee (CDC) implemented sanctions against 14 players of the FC Metalist Kharkiv on petition of the FFU Committee on ethics and fair play. Most players were restricted from conducting any activity related to football between six months to a year. Sanctions of three out of those 14 players exceeded that period up to three years and included such players as Yevhen Malyk (2yrs), Dmytro Skarzhynskyi (3yrs), and Oleksandr Medvedev (3yrs).

(The original) Metalist Kharkiv was in October 2017 confiscated by a Ukrainian court from Kurchenko and placed under state property. At the time the club did not participate in any official sanctioned competitions. In August of 2017, all assets of the late Metalist including its non-material assets and corporate rights of PAT "FC Metalist", TOV "Metalist Holding", and TOV "Metalist-Arena" were transferred to the state property when to the assets of Viktor Yanukovych associates on petition of the Prosecutor General was implemented the procedure of special confiscation. The approximate value of the assets accounted for about $220 million, $65 million of which is the actual property of FC Metalist. Decision about the confiscation was adopted by the Sosnivskyi District Court of Cherkasy, while its public promotion was carried out by Prosecutor General Yuriy Lutsenko.

On 22 December 2017 it became known that among creditors who filed claims against the club are Kharkivoblenerho, Kharkivgaszbut, town of Vysochansk, Metalist Stadium, Cyprus off-shore company Hensley Capital Limited (a founding company of the club), State Fiscal Service in Kharkiv Oblast. In addition, the club indebted about ₴846 million to its former playing and non-playing staff.

For undetermined reason the Metalist property was never transferred to the Assets Recovery and Management Agency (ARMA) which is a state agency in management of recovered property. Instead, on 11 April 2018 the Cabinet of Ukraine ordered the property to be transferred under administration of the Kharkiv Oblast State Administration (see Governor of Kharkiv Oblast).

Metal Kharkiv and club reformation

A new team based in Kharkiv and named Metal was founded in 2019 by former vice-president of Dynamo Kyiv and former sportive director of Metalist Yevhen Krasnikov. Metal debuted in the Ukrainian Second League in the 2020–21 season. Along with Oleksandr Kucher as the head coach, Metal was joined by former head coach of Metalist 1925 Kharkiv Oleksandr Pryzetko. After winning the Second League in June 2021, it was confirmed that Metal will be renamed to Metalist and the old logo will be returned to the club, along with its brand and history. The new president became Oleksandr Yaroslavsky, who was in charge of the club from 2005 to 2012. In interview on 23 February 2021 Yaroslavsky noted that the Metalist debts should be paid by those who created them and he has no intentions to get involved with them.

Stadium

As Metalist Stadium was one of the venues for UEFA Euro 2012, the management decided to reconstruct and expand the arena and turn it into a modern recreational and leisure facility. In May 2008, Metalist Arena was the venue for 2008 Ukrainian Cup Final.

Presidents
 1992–1994 Dmitriy Droznik
 1996–2001 Valeriy Buhay
 2001–2004 Oleksandr Feldman
 2005–2012 Oleksandr Yaroslavsky
 2012–2017 Serhiy Kurchenko
 2017–2019 club was liquidated and revived based on Metal Kharkiv (2019–2021 Yevhen Krasnikov)
 2021– Oleksandr Yaroslavskyi

Honours
League
 Ukrainian Premier League
 Runners-up: 2012–13
 Third place (6): 2006–07, 2007–08 (stripped), 2008–09, 2009–10, 2010–11, 2011–12, 2013–14
 Soviet First League
 Winners: 1981
 Ukrainian First League
 Runners-up: 2003–04
 Ukrainian Second League (as FC Metal Kharkiv) Winners: 2020–21
 Championship of the Ukrainian SSR
 Winners: 1978

Cups
 Soviet Cup
 Winners: 1987–88
 Runners-up: 1983
 Ukrainian Cup
 Runners-up: 1992
 USSR Federation Cup
 Runners-up: 1987
 Soviet Super Cup
 Runners-up: 1989

Invitational
 DCM Trophy
 Winners (1): 1986

Football kits and sponsors

Rivalry
Metalist Kharkiv supporters biggest rivalry centred on Dnipro Dnipropetrovsk. Despite this fans of both clubs marched in support of a "united Ukraine" in Kharkiv during the April 2014 pro-Russian conflict in Ukraine.

A group of Metalist Kharkiv Ultras named "Sect 82" had a violent rivalry with Dynamo Kyiv. "Sect 82" was (at least until September 2013) allied with FC Spartak Moscow Ultras. (In 2014 "Sect 82" morphed into the Azov Battalion of the National Guard of Ukraine.)

Current squad

Out on loan

 Personnel 

 Coaching staff 

 Administration 

Player records

Top goalscorersAs of 6 December 2016Other – National Super Cup

Most appearancesAs of 10 November 2021Other – National Super Cup

League and Cup history

Soviet Union

Ukraine

Soviet Union

Ukraine

Metalist-2 (1997–2005)

Metalist in Europe

UEFA Team ranking

Last update: May 5, 2017
 Source: 

European history
Metalist Kharkiv participates in European competitions since 1988, when they played their first game against Borac Banja Luka. From 2007 to 2014, however, the club continuously participated on annual basis with variable successes. This ended when Metalist failed to qualify.

Best results:

Managers

 Oleksandr Ponomarov (1960–61)
 Viktor Zhylin (1962–63)
 Yevgeni Yeliseyev (1965–66)
 Viktor Kanevskyi (1968–71)
 Viktor Terentiev (1972)
 Yuriy Voynov (1972–73)
 Oleg Oshenkov (1975–76)
 Yevhen Lemeshko (1977–88)
 Leonid Tkachenko (1984–??)
 Oleksandr Dovbiy (1990–91)
 Viktor Aristov (1993)
 Oleksandr Dovbiy (1994)
 Mykhaylo Fomenko (July 1996 – June 2000)
 Oleksandr Dovbiy (1999–2000)
 Mykhaylo Fomenko (July 2001 – Nov 2002)
 Hennadiy Lytovchenko (July 2003 – Dec 2004)
 Oleksandr Zavarov (Jan 2005 – June 2005)
 Myron Markevych (July 2005 – 24 Feb 2014)
 Ihor Rakhayev (24 Feb 2014 – 4 June 2015)
 Oleksandr Sevidov (4 June 2015 – 18 April 2016)
 Oleksandr Pryzetko (interim) (18 April 2016 – May 2016)
 Oleksandr Kucher (30 July 2020 – 13 July 2022)
 Oleksandr Pryzetko (interim) (13 July 2022 – present)

See also

 FC Kharkiv
 FC Metalist 1925 Kharkiv

Notes

References

External links

Official website
Unofficial website
Official website of FC Metal
Vadim Shevyakin. Первый «Металлист» Маркевича (The first Metalist of Markevych)''. "mediaport". 7 September 2013.

 
Football clubs in Kharkiv
Ukrainian Premier League clubs
Association football clubs established in 1925
1925 establishments in Ukraine
Soviet Top League clubs
Football clubs in the Ukrainian Soviet Socialist Republic
Avanhard (sports society)
Manufacturing association football clubs in Ukraine
Phoenix clubs (association football)